

510001–510100 

|-id=045
| 510045 Vincematteo ||  || Vince Matteo (born 1941) is one of the most accomplished participants at the Adirondack Astronomy Retreat. His magnificent all-sky photograph showing the International Space Station, a meteor, and many constellations graces the retreat's lodge. He continues to mentor younger astronomers. || 
|}

510101–510200 

|-bgcolor=#f2f2f2
| colspan=4 align=center | 
|}

510201–510300 

|-bgcolor=#f2f2f2
| colspan=4 align=center | 
|}

510301–510400 

|-bgcolor=#f2f2f2
| colspan=4 align=center | 
|}

510401–510500 

|-id=466
| 510466 Varna ||  || The city of Varna, Bulgaria || 
|}

510501–510600 

|-bgcolor=#f2f2f2
| colspan=4 align=center | 
|}

510601–510700 

|-bgcolor=#f2f2f2
| colspan=4 align=center | 
|}

510701–510800 

|-bgcolor=#f2f2f2
| colspan=4 align=center | 
|}

510801–510900 

|-bgcolor=#f2f2f2
| colspan=4 align=center | 
|}

510901–511000 

|-bgcolor=#f2f2f2
| colspan=4 align=center | 
|}

References 

510001-511000